Angst is the surname of:

 Fritz Angst (1944–1976), German-language Swiss author better known as Fritz Zorn
 Heinrich Angst (1915–1989), Swiss bobsledder
 Jules Angst (born 1926), Swiss Emeritus Professor of Psychiatry at Zurich University
 Max Angst (1921–2002), Swiss bobsledder
 Randy Angst, American politician, member of the Missouri House of Representatives from 2003 to 2004
 Richard Angst (1905–1984), Swiss cinematographer

See also
 József Angster (1834–1918), Hungarian organ making master and founder of the Angster dynasty